In the 1980s Rajiv Gandhi, then the Prime Minister of India, had said that for every rupee targeted towards welfare and poverty alleviation only a fraction, 15 paise, reached the intended beneficiary. This observation by the Prime Minister has been called a guess, an estimate, not based on empirical data. While the statement has been connected to corruption, it has also been taken as an understanding of the large operating costs and overheads of administering public services. India's Chief Vigilance Commissioner later added that of the remaining, "40 paise perhaps can be accounted for administrative overheads and 45 paise is pure corruption".

It has also been felt and politically stated that even less than 15 paise is a truer estimate in some cases; 10 paise, even less than 5 paise. In 2007, in the same context, deputy chairman of the Planning Commission Montek Singh Ahluwalia said that the amount that reaches the poor has reached 50%. In 2009, Prime Minister Manmohan Singh agreed that there were still leakages, however not to the tune of what Rajiv Gandhi had felt. An empirical estimate based on a later study under economist Kirit Parikh came up with the figure of 16 paise. This figure varies between state and program. A 2005 study stated "one rupee of budgetary consumer subsidy is worth only 27 paise to the poor" with a finding that about 58% of food grains do not reach the intended target.

Following implementation of Aadhaar, direct benefit transfer, and with other improvements in last mile delivery, Prime Minister Narendra Modi could go on to state that for every rupee, every paisa will reach the poor.

References 

Rajiv Gandhi
Welfare in India